The Battle of Taif was fought between Ottoman forces and Syed Hussien bin Ali Sharif of Mecca in 1916. The Ottoman Army was in Taif, with Syed's forces besieging the city and after many weeks siege and fiercest struggle Syed's forces were able to capture the Taif. After the fall of Mecca in July 1916 the fall of Taif was a major blow for Turks who were fighting in First World War against Britain. The British helped Syed Hussien's bin Ali's Forces by providing them with guns.

Notes

References

Conflicts in 1916
1916 in the Ottoman Empire
Taif
History of Mecca
Battles of World War I involving the Ottoman Empire